The Serie C, is the third division of women's football in Italy. Established in 2018, it has been run by the Italian Football Federation.

Format

The league is divided into four groups of 12 teams for a playoff to Serie B.

References

External links
 

Sports leagues established in 2018
2018 establishments in Italy
women
1